Enokido Station (榎戸駅) is the name of two train stations in Japan:

 Enokido Station (Aichi)
 Enokido Station (Chiba)